Ashanti United SC is a football club in Dar es Salaam, Tanzania.

They play in the second level of Tanzanian professional football, the Tanzanian First Division League, They played in the Tanzanian Premier League in the 2014/15 season.
7,000 capacity Chamazi Stadium is their home stadium.

Current squad

External links
Logo

References

Football clubs in Tanzania
Sport in Dar es Salaam